Potatso National Park or Pudacuo National Park is a  national park located in Shangri-La County, Yunnan Province in the People's Republic of China. The park was announced on June 25, 2007, and is notable as the first national park in China to meet International Union for Conservation of Nature standards. It incorporates the Bita Lake Nature Reserve and the Duhu Scenic Area in the Hongshan region. As such they are part of the Three Parallel Rivers of Yunnan Protected Areas World Heritage Site.

Fauna and flora

The region of this park contains more than 20 percent of the country’s plant species, about one-third of its mammal and bird species and   almost 100 endangered species, though it comprises only 0.7 percent of China's land area. It is notably home to vulnerable Black-necked cranes, many rare and beautiful orchids, and Himalayan Yew, a coniferous tree whose extracts are a source of the anticancer drug, paclitaxel.

Visitor information

The park is 22 km away , about a 50-minute drive from Zhongdian. It has two lakes, a visitor center, several interesting minority villages, lush forests and pasture views.

It is surrounded by dense deciduous forests. The bus stops a few feet from a wharf from where visitors can take a boat ride around the lake and to the island in the center. Price for the boat ride is 50 Yuan. Alternatively, one may walk down the
 path from the South entrance and hike to and exit the park from the West entrance. Getting to the West entrance requires both a boat and ferry ride. The entire hike can take 4–6 hours. Riding horses are also available.

Free admission to Xiagei Village is included in the park’s 190 Yuan admission fee.

See also
List of national parks of the People's Republic of China

References

National parks of China
Geography of Dêqên Tibetan Autonomous Prefecture
World Heritage Sites in China
Protected areas established in 2007
Tourist attractions in Yunnan
Shangri-La